Matthew Dicken (born 27 December 1992) is an English professional darts player who currently competes in Professional Darts Corporation events.

Career

BDO

2010–11
In June 2010 Dicken reached the Quarter Final of the BDO International Open, he was beaten 2–0 by Gary Robson. He reached the Last 32 of the 2010 Welsh Masters, he was beaten 4–2 by Martin Atkins. In 2011 he won the British Teenage Open.

2015–17
In 2015 he returned to the BDO. In January 2015 he reached the Semi Final of the Romanian Classic. In February 2015 he beat Tony O'Shea in the Last 16 of the Scottish Open before losing to Madars Razma in the Quarter Final 5–3. In May 2015 he reached the Last 16 of the Denmark Open, he lost to Geert De Vos. Dicken Quit the BDO in 2017.

PDC

2012–15
Dicken entered the Professional Darts Corporation Q School in January 2012. He failed won a PDC tour card, he reached the Last 32 on the final day. He once again entered the Professional Darts Corporation Q School in January 2013. He failed to win a PDC tour card. He entered the Professional Darts Corporation Q School in January 2014 for the third time. He failed to win a PDC tour card.

References

External links

English darts players
1992 births
Living people
Professional Darts Corporation former pro tour players
British Darts Organisation players
21st-century English people